Tianya may refer to:

Tianya District, Sanya, Hainan, China
Tianya Town (天涯镇), in Tianya District
Tianya Haijiao (天涯海角), tourist attraction
Tianya Club (天涯虚拟社区), Internet forum in China